Niidu Landscape Conservation Area is a nature park which is located in Pärnu, Estonia.

The protected area was founded in 1958 to protect forest landscapes and communities, bird colonies of Pärnu.

References

Nature reserves in Estonia
Geography of Pärnu